Gakhar is a peaceful rural farming village located at 32.692889 (latitude) and 73.763629 (longitude). It is located on the Kharian to Dinga link road. The most direct route to the village is by traveling southwest from the city of Kharian.

The residents of Gakhar are predominantly historic Gujjar clans with the Phand tribe making up the majority of the village. Other clans within the village are the Mian,Gorsi, and Kohli clans.

The main source of income for its residents is still farming and agriculture, although over 50 percent of the villagers reside abroad, mainly in Europe and various other parts of the world. Gakhar is considered as one of the most peaceful villages in the Kharian Tehsil area as it holds no rivalries within the clans or people itself. It has two big mosques and a small mosque at the stop of Gakhar  also has an Idara which provides first-class education in the Quran teachings and Islam provides various levels of education from Hifz classes and Qirat classes. Over the years,  various individuals from all over the country who have studied at the Idara have completed courses successfully and have gone onto become one of the best Hafiz and Qaris in the country.Molana Ehsan shah sb imaam of the Makki mosque.He done 8 year study in islamic study.Gakhar also has its own Government Hospital and Government School as well as three schools in the neighboring village of Gakhar which is Chanan. Wisdom High School, for both boys and girls, Millat High School for boys and girls, and also Yasin Public High School Attowala for girls. Students travel from as far as Gujrat and Sri Alamgir, and also Mandi as well. It facilitates excellent education for its students, with above-average students graduating from metric studies.

Modern-day facilities are present in Gakhar today including electricity and gas. It also has its own sewer system running through Gakhar. Gakhar also has access to canal water which comes from Mangla Dam.

Gakhar is also known in the area for its Rent a car business, located on the main Dinga road. It holds up to 25 cars which can be pre-booked or self-driven. The majority of the car owners are residents of Gakhar or neighboring villages.

The villagers of Gakhar are political. There is GYF Gakhar youth welfare society has 6 members and these members all work hard for the welfare of the village.

Habib Bank of Pakistan is also present in Gakhar as well as a handful of shops.

It also holds its own Adara a place which the whole village uses in certain times of need, mainly deaths. It was built with all the villagers contributing towards its build.

The main streets which run through Gakhar are in excellent order with vehicles passing freely from one side to the other.

Recently residents of Gakhar formed an association whereby members contribute a fixed amount each month into a fund which in turn is used to spend money within Gakhar. Over 100 members mainly in the UK meet up regularly in Burnley to discuss issues and needs of the village. Varies different projects have been carried out like the cleaning of gutters which takes place every week bus stops solar lights and varies other projects have been carried out.

The main towns near Gakhar are Dinga which is located about 7 km away and Kharian located about 17 km away.

Gujjar clans who reside in Gakhar

Phand
Koli
 Mian 
 Gorsi

Mehfil-E-Naat 

The first Mehfil-E-Naat took place in Gakhar; on that occasion numerous speakers come and contributed their teachings at the Mehfil. The main speaker on the day was Makhdom Jaffer Hussain Qureshi from Multan.

References

Populated places in Gujrat District